Chevra Linas Hazedek Synagogue of Harlem and the Bronx was a synagogue located at 1115 Ward Avenue in the Soundview neighborhood of the Bronx, New York City. The building was constructed between 1928 and 1932, and is a three-story, vernacular Romanesque Revival style.  It has a plastic slate roof and yellow brick front façade with red brick and cast-stone accents.  The front facade features a set of seven round-arch lancet stained-glass windows separated by wreathed cast-stone columns. In 1979, the synagogue sold the building to the Green Pasture Baptist Church, which has occupied the building since then.

The building was added to the National Register of Historic Places in 2014.

References

External links

Synagogues in the Bronx
Former synagogues in New York (state)
Baptist churches in New York City
Properties of religious function on the National Register of Historic Places in the Bronx
Synagogues on the National Register of Historic Places in New York City
Synagogues completed in 1932
1932 establishments in New York City
Romanesque Revival architecture in New York City
Romanesque Revival synagogues
Soundview, Bronx
Churches in the Bronx